Sportvereniging Zulte Waregem, commonly known as Zulte Waregem or by their nickname Essevee, is a Belgian professional football club based in Waregem, West Flanders.  Zulte Waregem plays in the Belgian First Division A. Their highest finish at the highest level was second place in 2012–13. They have won two Belgian Cups. They qualified for the 2006–07 UEFA Cup, losing in the round of 32 to Newcastle United. Also in the seasons 2013–2014 and 2017–2018 they managed to play in the Europa League group stages. On both occasions the club ended 3rd in their group.

The club is a product of a partnership in 2001 between Zultse VV and KSV Waregem, a former first division regular. No merger was applied.  Zulte Waregem first reached the highest level in Belgian football by winning the 2004–05 second division. The club uniforms are red and green. They play their home matches at the Regenboogstadion, the former stadium of KSV Waregem.

History 
Zulte Sportief was founded in 1950 and directly became a member of the national association (matricule n° 5381).  The club Zultse V.V. (with the same matricule) was started after the 1976 merger between Zulte Sportief and S.K. Zulte. In 2001, the team merged with K.S.V. Waregem, who had played in the first division for many years. No team from Zulte ever achieved promotion to the second division before S.V. Zulte Waregem in 2002.  Zultse V.V., though, gained access to the third division in 1995. The club finished 14th out of 16 for two seasons and was relegated the second time after the playoff.

In 1999, the season in which it came back, Zultse finished fourth in this division. Two years later, the new club became champion of the 3rd division A.  The registered office of Zulte Waregem lies in Zulte, but the club is based in the stadium of K.S.V. Waregem in Waregem and the red and white colours of K.S.V. Waregem prevail.

The club got a chance to shine on the European stage during the 2006–07 UEFA Cup, reaching the round of 32, playing against English club Newcastle United, although they lost 4–1 on aggregate. Their second European appearance was in the 2013–14 season, as Zulte Waregem finished second in 2012–13 Belgian Pro League and qualified for the third qualifying stage of the 2013–14 UEFA Champions League, where they lost to PSV (5–0 on aggregate). Zulte Waregem dropped to the 2013–14 UEFA Europa League play-off round, where they defeated APOEL, drawing 1–1 at home and winning 1–2 in Nicosia thanks to a late goal from Jens Naessens. At the group stage, they were drawn alongside Rubin Kazan, Wigan Athletic and Maribor. Zulte Waregem started with a draw against Wigan. After, they lost to Rubin (4–0) and Maribor (1–3), but later managed to defeat Maribor at Ljudski vrt (0–1) and Wigan at DW Stadium (1–2). Finally, a loss against Rubin at home and Maribor's win over Wigan eliminated Zulte Waregem from the European competition. In the 2016–17 season, Zulte Waregem drew an average home attendance of 9,578.

Stadium 
Zulte Waregem plays its home matches at the Regenboogstadion, meaning "Rainbow Stadium" in Dutch. The stadium used to be the home of K.S.V. Waregem until the withdrawal of the club. It has a capacity of 12.250 and has been renovated lately to host European games.  The hospitality accommodations and the field can be seen their own Virtual Tour or on Google Streetview. The Regenboogstadion meets UEFA's requirements for hosting European games (Category 4 stadium), so Zulte Waregem's home matches can be played in their own stadium, which they did in de 2017-2018 Europa League competition. Zulte Waregem has an average attendance of 9.500 people at home games.

Honours 
Belgian Pro League:
Runners-up: 2012–13
Belgian Second Division:
Winners: 2004–05
Belgian Cup:
Winners: 2005–06, 2016–17
Runners-up: 2013–14
Belgian Supercup:
Runners-up: 2006, 2017

European record

Players

Club Officials

Managers 
 Eddy van den Berge (July 1, 1962 – June 30, 1963)
 Francky Dury (July 1, 2001 – June 30, 2010)
 Bart De Roover (July 1, 2010 – Oct 24, 2010)
 Hugo Broos (Oct 27, 2010 – May 23, 2011)
 Darije Kalezić (July 1, 2011 – Dec 27, 2011)
 Francky Dury (Dec 30, 2011–2021)

References

External links 

 Official Website
 Zulte Waregem at UEFA.COM
 Zulte Waregem at EUFO.DE
 Zulte Waregem at Weltfusball.de
 Zulte Waregem at Football Squads.co.uk
 Zulte Waregem at Football-Lineups.com

 
Association football clubs established in 2001
Football clubs in Belgium
2001 establishments in Belgium
Belgian Pro League clubs
Zulte
Waregem